Saint-Géréon is a former commune in the Loire-Atlantique department in western France. On 1 January 2019, it was merged into the new commune of Ancenis-Saint-Géréon.

See also
Communes of the Loire-Atlantique department
Gereon

References

Saintgereon
2019 disestablishments in France
Populated places disestablished in 2019